Bliznino is a rural locality (a village) in Vtorovskoye Rural Settlement, Kameshkovsky District, Vladimir Oblast, Russia. The population was 18 as of 2010.

Geography 
Bliznino is located 22 km southwest of Kameshkovo (the district's administrative centre) by road. Laptevo is the nearest rural locality.

References 

Rural localities in Kameshkovsky District